The Office of the Privacy Commissioner for Personal Data (PCPD) is a Hong Kong statutory body enforcing the Personal Data (Privacy) Ordinance, which secured the protection of privacy of individuals. The office is headed by the Privacy Commissioner for Personal Data, Ada Chung.

The office is divided into six divisions: Complaints Division, Compliance Division, Legal Division, Policy and Research Division, Communications and Education Division, and Corporate Support and Enquiries Division.

Personal Data (Privacy) Ordinance 
The purpose of this ordinance is to protect the privacy rights of a person in regard to his personal data, ie the Data Subject. The ordinance was passed in 1995.

Data subject refers to :
the information which relates to a living person and can be used to identify that person and
it exists in a form in which access or processing is practicable

Examples of data subject protected by this ordinance include name, address, phone number, identity card number, photo, medical record and employment records.  The data user, who collects, holds, or process this data is liable for any unlawful or wrongful use of this data.

List of Privacy Commissioners for Personal Data 
Stephen Lau Ka-man (1 August 1996 – 31 October 2001)
Raymond Tang Yee-Bong (1 November 2001 – 31 July 2005)
Roderick Woo Bun (1 August 2005 – 31 July 2010)
Allan Chiang Yam-wang (1 August 2010 – 3 August 2015)
Stephen Wong Kai-yi (4 August 2015 – 3 September 2020)
Ada Chung Lai-ling (since 4 September 2020)

Reported data privacy issue of public concern

2010 Octopus sold personal data of customers for HK$44m
In 2010, it was reported that Octopus Card issuer has made HK$44 million in the past  years by selling cardholder data. This was disclosed in a special hearing conducted by the personal data privacy commissioner.  Octopus Holdings chief executive Prudence Chan Bik-wah said she wished to 'sincerely apologise' to affected cardholders.

2010 Six banks transfer personal data for marketing purposes 
In August 2010, the Hong Kong Monetary Authority publicly disclosed that CITIC Bank International, Citibank, Fubon Bank, Industrial and Commercial Bank of China, Wing Hang Bank, and Wing Lung Bank were guilty of transferring customer data to unaffiliated parties for marketing purposes. In a separate investigation, the privacy commissioner for personal data concluded that the actions of some of the banks were equivalent to the sale of personal data.

2017 Notebooks containing HK voters data was stolen
The Registration and Electoral Office reported in March 2017, right after the chief executive election, that they have lost 2 laptop computers containing 3.7 million voters personal information. This could be one of the most significant data breaches ever in Hong Kong, consider the city population is less than 8 million.

References

External links 
Official website
Personal Data (Privacy) Ordinance (Cap. 486)

Privacy Commissioner for Personal Data
Hong Kong
1996 establishments in Hong Kong